Superior Bay is a narrow inlet of Lake Superior along the border of Minnesota and Wisconsin. A small strait connects it to the Saint Louis Bay to the west, into which the Saint Louis River empties. Superior Bay is located between the city of Superior and the Park Point neighborhood of Duluth. The Duluth Harbor Basin is nearby.

References

Bays of Wisconsin
Geography of Duluth, Minnesota
Bodies of water of Douglas County, Wisconsin
Bays of Lake Superior